Centaurea hermannii, is a perennial herbaceous plant belonging to the genus Centaurea of the family Asteraceae. It is an endemic plant of Turkey and found only in Çatalca Peninsula, and threatened by habitat loss.

References

hermannii
Flora of European Turkey